Mario Knögler (born 2 July 1979) is an Austrian sport shooter. He was born in Wels. He competed at the 2000, 2004 and 2008 Summer Olympics.

Records

References

External links

1979 births
Living people
People from Wels
Austrian male sport shooters
Olympic shooters of Austria
Shooters at the 2000 Summer Olympics
Shooters at the 2004 Summer Olympics
Shooters at the 2008 Summer Olympics
Sportspeople from Upper Austria
21st-century Austrian people